The Telecommunications Dispute Settlement and Appellate Tribunal (TDSAT) was established to adjudicate disputes and dispose of appeals with a view to protect the interests of service providers and consumers of the Indian telecommunications sector and to promote and ensure its orderly growth.

History

The policy of liberalisation that was embarked by Prime Minister P. V. Narasimha Rao in the 1990s helped the Indian Telecom sector to grow rapidly. The government gradually allowed the entry of the private sectors into telecom equipment manufacturing, value added services, radio paging and cellular mobile services. In 1994, the government formed the National Telecom Policy (NTP) which helped to attract Foreign Direct Investments (FDI) and domestic investments. The entry of private and international players resulted in need of independent regulatory body. As a result, The Telecom Regulatory Authority of India (TRAI) was established on 20 February 1997 by an act of parliament called "Telecom Regulatory Authority of India Act 1997".

The mission of TRAI was to create and nurture an environment which will enable quick growth of the telecommunication sector in the country. One of the major objective of TRAI is to provide a transparent policy environment. TRAI has regularly issued orders and directions on various subjects like tariff, interconnections, Direct To Home (DTH) services and mobile number portability.

In 2000, the Vajpayee government constituted the Telecommunications Dispute Settlement Appellate Tribunal (TDSAT) through an amendment of the 1997 act, through an ordinance. The primary objective of TDSAT's establishment was to release TRAI from adjudicatory and dispute settlement functions in order to strengthen the regulatory framework. Any dispute involving parties like licensor, licensee, service provider and consumers are resolved by TDSAT. Moreover, any direction, order or decision of TRAI can be challenged by appealing in TDSAT.

Organisation structure
  
The TDSAT consists of a Chairperson and two Members.

The current composition of the Tribunal is:

List of former Chairmen of TDSAT:

List of former Members of TDSAT:

See also
 Communications in India
 The Telecom Commercial Communication Customer Preference Regulations, 2010

References

External links
 

2000 establishments in India
Government agencies established in 2000
Telecommunications authorities of India
Government agencies of India
Vajpayee administration
Indian Tribunals